Rolland "Red" Bastien (January 27, 1931 – August 11, 2012) was an American professional wrestler best known for his time in Capital Wrestling Corporation where he was a 3 time WWWF United States Tagteam champion with his kayfabe brother, Lou Bastien.

Professional wrestling career
He took part in football and swimming in high school and broke in on Midwest carnivals, fighting local toughs and learning wrestling the hard way. Turning professional, he began in Chicago, Illinois and toured the United States with great success. Bastien was small for a wrestler at 185 pounds, but he was quick, vigorous, fast and employed a wide assortment of aerial moves. His teachers were Henry Kolln, Einar Olsen, Joe Pazandak and Verne Gagne, and his peak years were from 1959 to 1971. His favorite finishing moves were the dropkick, flying head scissors, atomic drop and abdominal stretch.

Bastien teamed up with Lou Klein to form the Bastien Brothers tag team and, in 1960, won the United States Tag Team Championship from Eddie and Jerry Graham in April 1960. They won the title twice more in 1960, from the Grahams and then from the Fabulous Kangaroos (Roy Heffernan and Al Costello). Bastien went on to win several more tag team championships.

Bastien was the frequent tag team partner of Billy Red Lyons. The duo unmasked wrestler Don Jardine in 1972.

Bastien was the booker in Dallas, Texas.

In 1964, Bastein appeared in the World Wide Wrestling Federation (WWWF) and teamed briefly with champion Bruno Sammartino.
He returned for one match in Madison Square Garden in June 1970 (his last appearance there), being pinned by Professor Tanaka but prior to that, putting on an amazing performance, dominating most of the match.

He had a hot main event run in Florida in the late 1960s, including memorable bouts with Johnny Valentine.

In the mid to late '70s, he returned to the WWWF/WWF, wrestling under a mask as "Texas Red".

In his retirement, Bastien became a trainer and a promoter, and discovered future wrestlers Steve "Sting" Borden and Jim "The Ultimate Warrior" Hellwig at a Gold's Gym and convinced them to become professional wrestlers. Bastien and professional wrestling manager Rick Bassman formed an alliance of wrestlers called Powerteam USA, of which Borden and Hellwig were a part. The team debuted in November 1985, and after the other two members left the group, Borden and Hellwig continued to tag together.

Personal life
Bastien was good friends with fellow wrestler Roddy Piper and was the best man at his wedding. Bastien served as president of the Cauliflower Alley Club for six years from 2001 to 2007, but was reported in 2010 to be suffering from Alzheimer’s disease, his health progressively getting worse. Bastien died on August 11, 2012, at age 81.

Championships and accomplishments 
American Wrestling Alliance
AWA World Tag Team Championship (2 times) - with Lou Bastien
American Wrestling Association
AWA World Tag Team Championship (1 time) - with Hercules Cortez and replacement partner The Crusher (1)
Capitol Wrestling Corporation
NWA United States Tag Team Championship (Northeast version) (3 times) - with Lou Bastien
Cauliflower Alley Club
President (2001-2007)
Championship Wrestling from Florida
NWA Florida Heavyweight Championship (1 time)
NWA Southern Heavyweight Championship (Florida version) (1 time)
George Tragos/Lou Thesz Professional Wrestling Hall of Fame
 Class of 2007
International Wrestling Alliance (Japan)
IWA Tag Team Championship (1 time) - with Bill Howard
NWA All-Star Wrestling
NWA Canadian Tag Team Championship (Vancouver version) (1 time) - with Jim Hady
NWA Big Time Wrestling
NWA Texas Heavyweight Championship (2 times)
NWA Texas Junior Heavyweight Championship (1 time)
NWA Texas Tag Team Championship (2 times) - with Billy Red Lyons (1) and Tex McKenzie (1)
NWA Hollywood Wrestling
NWA Americas Heavyweight Championship (2 times)
NWA Americas Tag Team Championship (1 time) - with Victor Rivera
NWA International Television Tag Team Championship (1 time) - with Bearcat Wright
Pacific Northwest Wrestling
NWA Pacific Northwest Tag Team Championship (2 times) - with Andre Drapp (1) and Roy Heffernan (1)
Pacific Coast Junior Heavyweight Championship (1 time)
Professional Wrestling Championship
Lifetime Achievement Award (2006)
Professional Wrestling Hall of Fame
Class of 2018 Inducted under Executive and under Tag Team as a member of The Flying Redheads.
World Championship Wrestling (Australia)
IWA World Tag Team Championship (3 times) - with Mario Milano

References

External links 
 Online World of Wrestling profile

1931 births
2012 deaths
20th-century professional wrestlers
American male professional wrestlers
Masked wrestlers
Deaths from Alzheimer's disease
Neurological disease deaths in Minnesota
Professional wrestlers from North Dakota
Professional wrestling executives
Professional Wrestling Hall of Fame and Museum
Stampede Wrestling alumni
AWA World Tag Team Champions
NWA Florida Heavyweight Champions
NWA Southern Heavyweight Champions (Florida version)
NWA Americas Tag Team Champions
NWA Americas Heavyweight Champions
IWA World Tag Team Champions (Australia)